Sir Charles Cockerell, 1st Baronet (18 February 1755 – 6 January 1837) was a Somerset-born Englishman who prospered as an official of the East India Company (EIC) and became a politician. He sat in the House of Commons for most of the period between 1802 and 1837, sitting for five different constituencies.

Life and career
He was born in Bishop's Hull, Somerset, the son of John Cockerell and Frances, daughter of John Jackson of Clapham. Through his mother Cockerell was the great-great nephew of the diarist Samuel Pepys.

After education at Sharpe's school in Bromley-by-Bow and later Winchester College between 1767 and 1769, Cockerell arrived in Bengal, India in 1776 as a writer (clerk) for the EIC's surveyor-general's office. He became friends with Warren Hastings, the first Governor-General of India and Richard Wellesley, 1st Marquess Wellesley, brother of the Duke of Wellington. Whilst employed by the EIC he was also a partner and later principal of the Calcutta bank of Cockerell, Trail & Co. During the Fourth Anglo-Mysore War (1798-9), Cockerell assisted Wellesley as commander of the civil service military force and through financial arrangements with the Bengal government. As a result of these services he was raised to the Baronetage of England on 25 September 1809.

In 1801 he returned to England to live at Sezincote House in Gloucestershire, which he had inherited from his elder brother, John. He then commissioned another brother, Samuel Pepys Cockerell, to build him a house "in the Indian style".

Whilst remaining as an agent for the EIC, Cockerell was introduced as a Member of Parliament for Tregony by Richard Barwell, whom he had known in India. He was a silent supporter of Henry Addington's ministry and considered doubtful by William Pitt the Younger on the latter's reelection in 1804. After failing to secure a seat in the 1806 Election, Cockerell was returned to Parliament for Lostwithiel in January 1807. He was subsequently MP for Bletchingley from 1809 to 1812, Seaford from 1816 to 1818 and for Evesham from 1819 to 1837. Cockerell served as Mayor of Evesham from 1810 to 1833.

Personal life

On 11 March 1789 in Calcutta, he married Maria-Tryphena (d. 8 Oct. 1789), daughter of Sir Charles William Blunt, 3rd Baronet of the Blunt baronets. He married secondly on 13 February 1808 the Honourable Harriet Rushout, daughter of John Rushout, 1st Baron Northwick. The couple had a son, Charles Rushout Cockerell (b.1809), who succeeded to the baronetcy and two daughters, Harriet-Anne and Elizabeth Maria (d.1832). Charles Rushout Cockerell married the Honourable Cecilia-Olivia, daughter of Thomas Foley, 3rd Baron Foley in 1834.

References

External links 
 

1755 births
1837 deaths
Baronets in the Baronetage of the United Kingdom
Members of the Parliament of the United Kingdom for English constituencies
British East India Company civil servants
UK MPs 1802–1806
UK MPs 1806–1807
UK MPs 1807–1812
UK MPs 1812–1818
UK MPs 1818–1820
UK MPs 1820–1826
UK MPs 1826–1830
UK MPs 1830–1831
UK MPs 1831–1832
UK MPs 1832–1835
UK MPs 1835–1837